Effingham Lawrence (March 2, 1820 – December 9, 1878) was an American politician known for serving for the shortest term in congressional history, serving - along with George A. Sheridan - for just one day in the U.S. House of Representatives.

Biography 
Lawrence was born in Bayside, Queens, New York, in 1820.  He was a descendant of John Lawrence and John Bowne, both Quakers and pioneer English settlers of Queens, NY.

Lawrence moved to Louisiana in 1843 and engaged in the planting and refining of sugar.  He served in the Louisiana State House of Representatives for some time and then successfully contested the re-election of Jacob Hale Sypher. Lawrence then served for one day in Congress but was not reelected. He died at Magnolia Plantation, Plaquemines Parish, Louisiana  in 1878.

Contested election 
The voting in the 1872 election was characterized by a number of irregularities, with Sypher initially being declared the winner and returned to Congress while Lawrence appealed the election results. Lawrence's belated replacement of Sypher, after courts intervened to nullify the original results and instead deliver the seat to Lawrence, marked the first time since the Civil War that a Democrat had defeated a Republican for a seat in Congress from Louisiana.

The 1874 voting in which Lawrence failed "re-election" to the seat had already been held before he was seated for the term to which he had, by the later court order, been elected in 1872. Thus, under the congressional calendar in effect at the time, Lawrence was able to serve for one day of the 1873–1875 term to which he had, in the end, been elected. On the following day—March 4, 1875—he was succeeded by Randall Lee Gibson, a Democrat who had defeated him during the preceding autumn.

See also
Cornelius Lawrence, his cousin
Thomas Johnson, shortest-serving U.S. Supreme Court justice
William Henry Harrison, shortest-serving president of the United States.

References

External links 
Congressional Biography
Political Graveyard

1820 births
1878 deaths
Businesspeople from New Orleans
Democratic Party members of the Louisiana House of Representatives
Politicians from New Orleans
People from Queens, New York
Democratic Party members of the United States House of Representatives from Louisiana
19th-century American politicians
19th-century American businesspeople